Mauroniscus is a genus of beetles in the family Mauroniscidae, historically included in the family Melyridae. The ten known species of this genus are found in South America in the countries of Argentina, Bolivia, Chile, Columbia, Ecuador, and Peru.

Species
 Mauroniscus apicalis (Pic, 1910)
 Mauroniscus boliviensis Majer, 1995
 Mauroniscus chiliensis Estrada & Solervicens, 2021
 Mauroniscus discipennis (Pic, 1910)
 Mauroniscus germaini Majer, 1995
 Mauroniscus maculatus (Pic, 1927)
 Mauroniscus roberti Bourgeois, 1911
 Mauroniscus subfasciatus (Pic, 1910)
 Mauroniscus titschaki (Pic, 1954)
 Mauroniscus wayrauchi Majer, 1995

References

Cleroidea
Cleroidea genera